Merve Dizdar (born 25 June 1986) is a Turkish actress. She made her television debut with a role in Aksanat Çocuk Oyunları.

Life and career 
Dizdar was born on 25 June 1986 in İzmir. She is a graduate of Çanakkale Onsekiz Mart University School of Fine Arts with a degree in acting. She received her master's degree in acting from Kadir Has University. She started her career on stage by joining Semaver Company and continued it at Craft Theatre. Dizdar made her cinematic debut with Bir Ses Böler Geceyi alongside Cem Davran and pursued a career in television with recurring roles in the series Kavak Yelleri, Geniş Aile, Bir Yastıkta, Doksanlar, Çılgın Dershane Üniversite, and was first noted with her role in Beş Kardeş. She also worked for TRT Children, presenting the programs Arkadaşım Bıdı and 23 Nisan Şenliğe Doğru.

Dizdar won the Afife Jale Theatre Best Actress Award for her role in the play Yutmak. She then joined the cast of hit series 7 Yüz, Vatanım Sensin, and Mucize Doktor respectively. In 2020, she had a leading role with Uraz Kaygılaroğlu in the Gupse Özay's comedy film Eltilerin Savaşı, which as of April 2021 is the 22nd most-watched movie of all time in Turkey according to Box Office Türkiye. She shared the leading role with Serenay Sarıkaya, Ezgi Mola, Enis Arıkan, Şükrü Özyıldız, and İbrahim Selim in a musical adaptation of Alice's Adventures in Wonderland. In 2020, she started to play in the series Masumlar Apartmanı.

Theatre

Filmography

Awards 
 XVII. Direct Audience Awards - "Small Hall Actress" - Yutmak - Craft Theatre - 2017
 21st Afife Theatre Awards - "Most Successful Actress of the Year" - Yutmak - Craft Theatre - 2017

References

External links 
   
 

1986 births
Actresses from İzmir
Turkish stage actresses
Turkish television actresses
Turkish film actresses
Living people